= Alfred Jeslein =

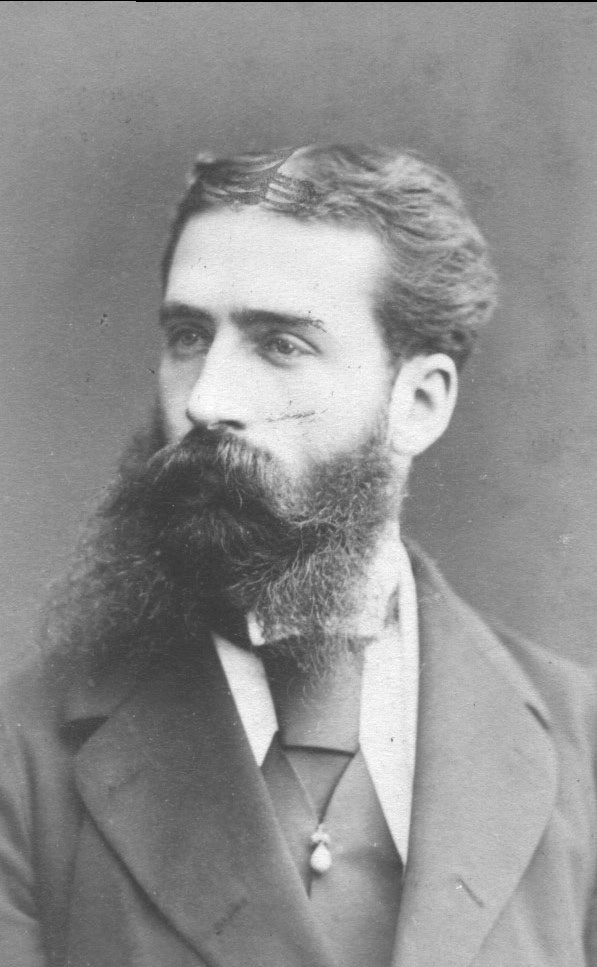
Alfred Jeslein, consul of the Orange Free State in Brussels, Belgium (1874).

Alfred Jeslein was consul of the Orange Free State in Brussels, Belgium in 1874.
